During the 1982–83 Scottish football season, Celtic competed in the Scottish Premier Division.

Competitions

Scottish Premier Division

League table

Matches

Scottish Cup

Scottish League Cup

European Cup

Staff

Transfers

References

Celtic F.C. seasons
Celtic